Gibbula dalli is a species of sea snail, a marine gastropod mollusk in the family Trochidae, the top snails.

It is only known as a fossil from the Miocene of Chile and the Eocene of Argentina. It occurred between 55.8 Ma and 15.97 Ma ago. It was a marine epifaunal grazer in the offshore zone.

References

External links
 J.J. Flynn et al., A new fossil_mammal assemblage from the southern Chilean Andes; implications for geology, geochronology and tectonics;  Journal of South American Earth Sciences 15 (2002) 285–302

dalli